Silver Lake is a dry lake bed  in the Mojave Desert of San Bernardino County, California, along Interstate 15,  northeast of Barstow.

History
Silver Lake, along with the adjacent Soda Lake, is what remains of Lake Mojave, a large, perennial lake that existed through the Holocene.

Geography
The Mojave River terminates at Soda Lake, but the river has flowed into Silver Lake in historic times (as recently as the very wet winter of 2004–2005). A channel that has been modified by humans exists between the lakes. The lake occasionally has water, but is usually dry.

Silver Lake does not have salt crusts, like Soda Lake does, because the groundwater is deeper. Salt crusts form from the repeated capillary rise of salty groundwater, followed by evaporation.

References

Endorheic lakes of California
Lakes of the Mojave Desert
Mojave River
Lakes of San Bernardino County, California
Lakes of California
Lakes of Southern California